A dyadic (or 2-adic) distribution is a specific type of discrete or categorical probability distribution that is of some theoretical importance in data compression.

Definition

A dyadic distribution is a probability distribution whose probability mass function is

where n is some positive integer. More generally it is a categorical distribution in which the probability assigned to any label is of the above form

It is possible to find a binary code defined on this distribution, which has an average code length that is equal to the entropy.

References

 Cover, T.M., Joy A. Thomas, J.A. (2006) Elements of information theory, Wiley. 

Types of probability distributions
Data compression
Discrete distributions